Jonas Brodin (born 12 July 1993) is a Swedish professional ice hockey defenceman for the Minnesota Wild of the National Hockey League (NHL). He was drafted tenth overall by the Wild in the 2011 NHL Entry Draft. Born in Karlstad, he was raised in Edsvalla.

Playing career
Following two seasons with Färjestad BK of the Swedish Elite League (SEL), Brodin was selected 10th overall by the Minnesota Wild in the 2011 NHL Entry Draft. On 12 July 2011, the Wild signed him to a three-year, entry-level contract.

Brodin joined the Wild's American Hockey League (AHL) affiliate, the Houston Aeros to begin the 2012–13 season. On 3 November, he suffered a broken clavicle as the result of a hit from Oklahoma City Barons' forward Taylor Hall. He returned 12 weeks later. Brodin made his debut for the Wild on 25 January 2013, recording his first career point (an assist) in a 5–3 loss to the Detroit Red Wings. On 14 March, Brodin scored his first NHL goal, on Semyon Varlamov of the Colorado Avalanche; his parents were in attendance to see it. Brodin led all first-year players in ice time and tallied two goals and nine assists for 11 points in his rookie season. He was also named to the NHL All-Rookie Team.

Brodin played in 79 games during his sophomore season, increasing his point total to 19.

On 12 October 2014, the Wild signed Brodin to a six-year, $25 million contract extension.

Brodin had a career-high 28 points during the 2019–20 season. On 15 September 2020, the Wild signed Brodin to a seven-year, $42 million contract extension.

Career statistics

Regular season and playoffs

International

Awards and honours

References

External links

1993 births
Färjestad BK players
Houston Aeros (1994–2013) players
Living people
Minnesota Wild draft picks
Minnesota Wild players
National Hockey League first-round draft picks
People from Karlstad Municipality
Swedish ice hockey defencemen
Swedish expatriate ice hockey players in Canada
Sportspeople from Värmland County